Chris La Bryant White (born February 28, 1983) is a former American football center. He was signed by the Green Bay Packers as an undrafted free agent in 2005. He played college football at the University of Southern Mississippi.

External links
Seattle Seahawks bio
Houston Texans bio
Green Bay Packers bio

1983 births
Living people
People from South Carolina
American football offensive guards
American football centers
Southern Miss Golden Eagles football players
Seattle Seahawks players
Green Bay Packers players
Houston Texans players
New York Giants players